The Ursula K. Le Guin Prize, established in 2022, is an annual, English-language literary award presented in honor of Ursula K. Le Guin. The $25,000 prize is awarded to an author for a single work of "imaginative fiction". The award is meant to honor authors who "can imagine real grounds for hope and see alternatives to how we live now".

Eligibility 
Books may be nominated for the prize by anyone and will be judged based on how well the work "reflects the concepts and ideas that were central to Ursula's own work, including but not limited to: hope, equity, and freedom; non-violence and alternatives to conflict; and a holistic view of humanity's place in the natural world".

To be eligible, a book must be a "book-length work of imaginative fiction written by a single author", "[p]ublished in the U.S. in English or in translation to English", and "[p]ublished in the specific window for each year's prize". After a writer wins the award once, they cannot be nominated for the prize again.

Additionally, the award "give[s] weight to writers whose access to resources may be limited due to race, gender, age, class or other factors; who are working outside of institutional frameworks like MFA programs; who live outside of cultural centers such as New York; and who have not yet been widely recognized for their work".

Recipients

References

External links 

 Official website

English-language literary awards
Awards established in 2022